Aidan Tallis (born 2002) is an Irish hurler. At the club level he plays with Lidsowney and at inter-county level with the Kilkenny senior hurling team.

Career

Tallis first played hurling at juvenile and underage levels with the Lisdowney club, while also playing as a schoolboy with Coláiste Mhuire in Johnstown. He progressed to adult level with his club and was top scorer when Lisdowney beat Thomastown to win the Kilkenny IHC title in 2020.

Tallis first appeared on the inter-county scene as goalkeeper on the Kilkenny minor hurling team that lost the 2019 All-Ireland minor final to Galway. He progressed to the under-20 team and was again in goal when Kilkenny beat Limerick in the 2022 All-Ireland under-20 final.

Tallis first played for the senior team during the 2023 Walsh Cup.

Career statistics

Honours

Lisdowney
Kilkenny Intermediate Hurling Championship: 2020

Kilkenny
All-Ireland Under-20 Hurling Championship: 2022
Leinster Under-20 Hurling Championship: 2022

References

2002 births
Living people
Lisdowney hurlers
Kilkenny inter-county hurlers
Hurling goalkeepers